The Crown Hotel is a public house on Lime Street, Liverpool, England.  It is recorded in the National Heritage List for England as a designated Grade II listed building.

The Crown Hotel was built in 1905 in Art Nouveau style.  It is constructed in brick with some stucco, and has marble facing on the ground floor.  The building is in three storeys with an attic.  It has two fronts, one on Lime Street with two bays, the other on Skelhorne Street, with three bays.  Between the bays are pilasters rising to the top of the building, each surmounted by a cornice.  On the ground floor are doorways flanked by windows.  The Lime Street front and the middle and right bays on the Skelhorne Street front contain bow windows on each of the top two floors.  Between the floors is inscribed "CROWN" "HOTEL" in elaborate lettering.  The top two floors of the left bay in Skelhorne Street are occupied by a complex panel containing, in three lines, "WALKERS ALES WARRINGTON".  Each of the attics contains a lunette window over which is an elaborate architrave.  The interior contains moulded coffered ceilings and much engraved glass.

See also

Grade II listed buildings in Liverpool-L1

References

Grade II listed buildings in Liverpool
Pubs in Liverpool
Art Nouveau architecture in Liverpool
Grade II listed pubs in England
Hotel buildings completed in 1905
Art Nouveau hotels
1905 establishments in England